An Oboe quartet is a composition scored for oboe, violin, viola and basso. While the genre is not very common, Mozart wrote the most well known, his Oboe Quartet, K. 370. Other composers of oboe quartets include Johann Christian Bach, Josef Fiala, Franz Krommer, Colin Matthews, Peter McGarr and Jesús Torres. The oboe quartet form is often less preferable to composers than the standard string quartet, as indicated by the few compositions for this ensemble.

Chamber music